Dan II may refer to:

 Dan II of Wallachia (? – 1432), voivode (prince) of the principality of Wallachia 
 Dan II of Denmark